Hemiargus ceraunus, the Ceraunus blue, is a species of butterfly in the family Lycaenidae. The species was first described by Johan Christian Fabricius in 1793. It is found in the southwestern United States, southern Texas, Florida and the Florida Keys south through the West Indies, Mexico and Central America to South America. Strays may be found in North Carolina, Missouri, Kansas and Nevada. The habitat consists of open woodland, desert scrub, dunes, pastures, road edges and vacant lots.

The wingspan is 20–30 mm. The upperside of the males is light blue with a darker narrow border. Female are dark brown, often with blue wing bases. The underside is gray. Both wings have a row of dark postmedian dashes on the underside. Adults are on wing year round in Texas and southern Florida and in late summer in other parts of the range. Adults feed on flower nectar.

The larvae feed on the flowers and seedpods of various woody legumes, including Cassia brachiata, Abrus precatorius and Prosopis species.

Subspecies
Hemiargus ceraunus antibubastus Hübner, [1818] (Florida)
Hemiargus ceraunus astenidas (Lucas, 1857) (Mexico, Costa Rica)
Hemiargus ceraunus gyas (Edwards, 1871) (Arizona, California)

References

Polyommatini
Butterflies of Central America
Butterflies of the Caribbean
Butterflies of North America
Lycaenidae of South America
Butterflies described in 1793
Taxa named by Johan Christian Fabricius